This is a list of Duke Blue Devils football players in the NFL Draft.

Key

Selections

Notable undrafted players
Note: No drafts held before 1920

References

Duke

Duke Blue Devils NFL Draft